Operation Tor Shezada, also known as Operation Black Prince, was a joint operation between Afghanistan and the United Kingdom in Helmand Province in Afghanistan.

The operation was planned and executed by the International Security Assistance Force forces and Afghan army whose mission is to clear the Taliban from Seyyedabad to the south of Nad-e Ali in Helmand province, in parallel to similar operations by the U.S. Marine Corps in Northern Marjah.

References

Tor Shezada